FDR State Park may refer to:
F.D. Roosevelt State Park in Pine Mountain, Georgia
Franklin D. Roosevelt State Park in Yorktown, New York
Franklin D. Roosevelt Four Freedoms Park in New York City

See also
Roosevelt State Park in Mississippi